East Frisian (also East Friesian) is an adjective referring to East Frisia, a region in Germany. It can refer specifically to:

 East Frisians, the people from the region
 East Friesian (sheep), a breed of sheep originating there
 East Frisian Islands, off the coast of East Frisia
 East Frisian Low Saxon, the Low German dialect spoken there
 Ostfriesen and Alt-Oldenburger, a breed of horse originating there
 East Frisian language, a language historically spoken in Saterland

See also 
 Frisian (disambiguation)

Language and nationality disambiguation pages